The M7 is an electric multiple unit railroad car built by Bombardier, with delivery beginning in 2002, used by the MTA on the Long Island Rail Road (M7) and Metro-North Railroad (M7A). The M7 replaced the M1 railcars, which had previously provided electric service on these lines. The M7 fleets are powered from an electric third rail. A total of 1,172 M7 cars were built for the two railroads.

Description
Cars are arranged as married pairs, where each car contains a complete set of controls for an engineer, conductor, or brakeman. However, the 'B' Cars (denoted by odd-numbered car designations) contain a handicapped accessible restroom, which is larger than the restroom provided on the M1 and M3 railcars and designed to accommodate a wheelchair, as well as an attendant and/or service animal (such as a guide dog, hearing dog or service dog) accompanying the passenger. The enlarged bathroom reduces the number of seats in the car.

The M7 was built as two separate but similar models due to the different electrical and signaling systems on the LIRR and Metro-North. Their most notable differences are the color schemes on the cab end of each car. Metro-North M7As have blue fronts with white stripes, while LIRR's M7s have black and yellow fronts. In addition, the Metro-North uses under-running third rails (with the train's third-rail shoes collecting electricity from the bottom of the third rail) inherited from the former New York Central Railroad, and the LIRR uses over-running third rails. Metro-North's M7As are not equipped with illuminated number boards, while LIRR's M7s are. The Metro-North M7s were also used In the 2016 film The Girl on the Train.

On April 19, 2021, the LIRR proposed equipping two pairs of M7 railcars with batteries for travel in diesel territory, pending feasibility studies.

History
In late 1999, a contract was awarded to Bombardier for 836 LIRR M7s. Delivery began in early 2002, and test trains for the LIRR M7 began on the Ronkonkoma Branch. After several successful tests, LIRR M7 revenue service began on the Long Beach Branch on October 30, 2002, and Metro-North's first M7A started scheduled service in April 2004. All M7s were delivered by early 2007.

Accidents and incidents

On February 3, 2015, an M7A train on Metro-North's Harlem Line was involved in a level crossing collision with a car stopped on the tracks in Valhalla, New York. Six people were killed and at least fifteen were injured. Car #4333 was destroyed in the subsequent fire.
On October 8, 2016, an M7 train on the Long Island Rail Road's Port Jefferson Branch side swiped a work train near the New Hyde Park station. Multiple cars - 7033, 7034, and 7044 - were damaged, and were eventually scrapped. Car 7044's mate (7043) was in storage until 2017, when it was mated with car 7554, which lost its mate (7553; see below).
On January 4, 2017, an M7 train on the Long Island Rail Road's Atlantic Branch overshot a bumper at Atlantic Terminal's track 6. Although no one was killed, over 100 were injured. Car 7553 was seriously damaged in the collision after a broken rail pierced the underbody, creating a large hole. The car was eventually scrapped. Its mate (7554) was mated with car 7043.
On July 21, 2018, an M7 train on the Long Island Rail Road's West Side Yard derailed. Two cars - 7019 and 7364 - were damaged as a result.
On February 26, 2019, an M7 train on the Long Island Rail Road's Ronkonkoma Branch struck a truck, causing the lead car to derail and strike the Westbury station platform. Car 7425 was seriously damaged as a result, and was eventually scrapped. Three people in the truck were killed, while there were no fatalities on the train. The individuals were fleeing the scene of a motor vehicle accident and went around lowered railroad crossing gates.

Early troubleshooting
The M7 cars swayed from side to side more than intended when introduced to service, and required modifications to reduce the sway. In late 2006 the MTA began a replacement of all M7 armrests after paying out over $100,000 to customers who filed complaints. The factory-installed armrests were notorious for slipping into trouser pockets and then tearing them when sitting. The new design is of a different profile and is coated in a more fabric-friendly rubber. Some passengers complained about having fewer seats per B car, a consequence of the larger ADA-compliant restrooms, and about the width of the seats. Metro-North's management received feedback about the M7, which influenced the development of the M8 railcars for the New Haven Line.

In the fall of 2006, the M7As started to experience serious braking problems due to foliage on the right-of-way, a condition known as "Slip-Slide." This caused nearly 2/3 of the Metro-North fleet to be taken out of service, due to flat spots on wheels. While the LIRR fleet performed significantly better, stripped M1s from both railroads were reactivated, and diminished schedules were instituted until the M7 fleet was able to resume full operation.

, the fleet has the highest mean distance between failures out of the entire LIRR fleet. This partly had to do with the fleet's newness, and so the fleet often needed to be tested for reliability.

Gallery

See also
M1/M3 (railcar)
M8 (railcar)
M9 (railcar)
Long Island Rail Road
Metro-North Railroad

References

External links
MTA Long Island Rail Road official website
MTA Metro-North Railroad official website
Bombardier information page for M7

M7
M7
Bombardier Transportation multiple units
Rail passenger cars of the United States
Electric multiple units of the United States
750 V DC multiple units